Arturo Basile (16 January 1914 – 21 May 1968) was an Italian conductor. He was known mostly for his work in the Italian operatic repertoire, especially Puccini and Verdi.

Basile was born in Syracuse, Sicily. When he was 12, he studied the oboe at the Giuseppe Verdi Conservatory in Turin, with Franco Alfano as music director at the time. His teachers included Giorgio Federico Ghedini. After graduating in 1933, he took up conducting, and was leading the Orchestra Sinfonica dell' EIAR by the early 1940s. In 1946, he took first prize in a conducting competition with Tullio Serafin heading the jury. He was soon recording and performing at the world's major opera houses with the leading singers of the day, including Maria Callas, Renata Tebaldi, Price, Tucker, Giorgio Tozzi and Giuseppe di Stefano. While his reputation was still on the ascent, he was killed in a car accident in 1968 at the age of 54.

External links
Biography in Italian

1914 births
1968 deaths
People from Syracuse, Sicily
Italian male conductors (music)
Road incident deaths in Italy
1968 road incidents
20th-century Italian conductors (music)
20th-century Italian male musicians